Jiří Liška  (born 13 March 1982) is a retired Czech football defender and current football coach. He is currently the assistant manager of Oberlausitz Neugersdorf.

External links 
 
 Guardian Stats Centre
 Jiří Liška at Fupa

Czech footballers
Czech First League players
FC Vysočina Jihlava players
FC Slovan Liberec players
Living people
1982 births

Association football defenders
FC Oberlausitz Neugersdorf players
Sportspeople from Olomouc